

The Latécoère 32 was a flying boat built in France in 1928 for use on Aéropostale's mail routes to North Africa.

Development
A strengthened and enlarged version of the Latécoère 23, it was a parasol-wing monoplane with sponsons for stability in the water and two engines mounted in tandem push-pull configuration on the wing.

Operational history
Put into service on the Marseilles-Algiers and Toulouse-Algiers routes, the aircraft proved most unreliable and were involved in a number of accidents. At the end of 1931, the five surviving examples were re-engined with Hispano Suiza 12Hbr engines and re-designated Latécoère 32-3, which persisted in service a little longer.

Eight Latécoère 32's were built with the following construction numbers (numéros d'usine) and registrations:-
 no77 - F-AILN
 no78 - F-AILU
 no79 - F-AILT
 no80 - F-AISN
 no81 - F-AISO
 no82 - F-AIRU
 no84 - F-AITX
 no85 - F-AJBK

Variants
 Latécoère 32 - original version with Farman 12We engines.
 Latécoère 32-3 - remotorised version with Hispano-Suiza 12Hbr engines.

Operators
 Air France
 Aéropostale

Specifications (Latécoère 32-3)

See also

References
Notes

Bibliography

 Cuny, Jean. “Latécoère - Les Avions et Hydravions”.Paris. Docavia/Editions Lariviere. 1992. 
 Taylor, Michael J.H. . “ Jane's Encyclopedia of Aviation. Studio Editions. London. 1989.

External links

 aviafrance.com
 Уголок неба

1920s French mailplanes
Flying boats
3
Twin-engined push-pull aircraft
Parasol-wing aircraft
Aircraft first flown in 1928